"Crash into Me" is a song by American rock group Dave Matthews Band. It was released in December 1996 as the third single from their second album, Crash. It reached number 7 on the US Billboard Modern Rock Tracks chart in March 1997. The song was nominated for Best Rock Performance by a Duo or Group with Vocals at the 1998 Grammy Awards.

Background and writing
On VH1 Storytellers, Matthews stated that the song was written from the perspective of a Peeping Tom watching a girl at night through her bedroom window.

Track listing
U.S. promo CD single 1 / Australia promo CD single
"Crash into Me" (edit) — 4:15
"Crash into Me" (acoustic) — 5:18
"Crash into Me" (album version) — 5:16

U.S. promo CD single 2
"Crash into Me" — 5:16
"Ants Marching" (live) — 4:45
"So Much to Say" (acoustic) — 3:44
"Crash into Me" (acoustic) — 5:18
"Christmas Song" — 5:34

Music video
The music video was directed by Dean Karr and premiered on November 12, 1996. The video depicts the band members in a forest setting dressed in forest dweller style clothing while surrounded by dancers who perform interpretively around them.

Charts

Year-end charts

Cover versions

Stevie Nicks 
Stevie Nicks released "Crash into Me" as the first single from her album, The Soundstage Sessions, on March 17, 2009.  The promo, with the orchestra version of "Landslide" as the B-side, was serviced to radio on the week of March 3, 2009. It has been serviced to Triple A radio stations, and to XM Satellite Radio channel 45, The Spectrum, and XM channel 51, The Coffee House. The music video for the single is from her DVD Live in Chicago.

Stevie Nicks has often referred to the song simply as "Crash", hence the single cover title.

Track listing

Darren Criss and Steve Aoki 
In July 2019, Darren Criss and Steve Aoki released an EDM-style cover of "Crash Into Me." Darren Criss unveiled the song during a class at a gym in Los Angeles. He was excited to be able to work with an EDM pro like Aoki, having said in an interview with Billboard: "...before I had any access to Steve whatsoever, I was always like, 'Man, how the fuck would I pull this off?' So to be able to meet somebody of his pedigree who's exactly the kind of person who would be able to midwife this, it was great." The song was released on July 12, 2019, and peaked at number 12 on the Dance/Electronic Digital Song Sales chart at Billboard.

References 

Dave Matthews Band songs
1996 singles
2009 singles
Songs written by Dave Matthews
Song recordings produced by Steve Lillywhite
Stevie Nicks songs
Rock ballads
1996 songs
1990s ballads
Folk ballads